Paleotriakis is a genus of ground sharks that lived 70 - 64 million years ago in the Late Cretaceous period to early Paleocene
of Lebanon and Sweden.

Species 
There are two known species. 
 Palaeotriakis curtirostris (Davis, 1887)
 Palaeotriakis subserratus (Underwood & Ward, 2008)

References 

Prehistoric shark genera
Triakidae